The Esser-Barrat rifle was an experimental slide-action firearm in the United Kingdom at the start of the 20th century.  It was essentially a development on the Austrian Steyr-Mannlicher M1895 straight-pull bolt-action rifle, but with the bolt connected to a pump on the for-end of the stock.

The firearm was tested in Bisley Ranges, Bisley, Surrey in 1906, but never adopted for military use.

References

Trial and research firearms of the United Kingdom
Rifles of the United Kingdom